Felton is a rural locality in the Toowoomba Region, Queensland, Australia.

Geography 
Hodgson Creek flows across the area and forms part of the southwest boundary.

Felton East is a neighbourhood.

Felton has the following mountains:
  Mount Perkins, named after local politician Patrick Perkins 
  Mount Rolleston, named after Christopher Rolleston, Commissioner of Crown Lands for the Darling Downs

History 
The name Felton is taken from a pastoral run, which was named by pastoralist Charles Mallard, after his birthplace in England.

In 1877,  were resumed from the Felton pastoral run and offered for selection on 17 April 1877.

Mount Kent State School opened on 14 May 1883 and closed on 1959. It was on Ted Mengel Road.

East Felton State School opened in October 1921 and closed in 1967. It was at 34 Nunkulla Road.

Felton Hall was built in 1931. In 2015 a new hall was built by relocating a building from St Anthony's Catholic School in Harristown, Toowoomba.

Education 
There are no schools in Felton. The nearest government primary schools are:

 Pittsworth State School in Pittsworth to the north-west
 Southbrook Central State School in neighbouring Southbrook to the north
 Cambooya State School in neighbouring Cambooya to the north
 Greenmount State School in neighbouring Greenmount to the north-east
 Nobby State School in neighbouring Nobby to the east
 Back Plains State School in neighbouring Back Plains to the south
The nearest government secondary schools are:
 Pittsworth State High School in Pittsworth to the north-west
 Clifton State High School in Clifton to the south-east

Amenities 
Felton Hall is at 2775 Toowoomba Karara Road.

References

External links

Toowoomba Region
Localities in Queensland